Soil and Water Assessment Tool (SWAT) is a free and open source hydrology model and GIS computer simulation sponsored by the USDA.

SWAT is a well known geographic hydrological model in use by many universities and government agencies around the world, and integrates with commercial products like ArcGIS.

Some users of SWAT
The River Systems Research Group of the Department of Oceanography at the University of Washington
The Hydro and Agro Informatics Institute under the Ministry of Science and Technology of the Royal Thai Government
The Departments of Agricultural & Biological Engineering and Civil & Environmental Engineering at Purdue University

References

External links
 Water Quality Model Passes Another Test (SWAT)
 http://www.brc.tamus.edu/swat/

United States Department of Agriculture